SuperMercado! is an album by 2 Skinnee J's, released in 1998. A music video was made for the single, "Riot Nrrrd."

Critical reception
The Washington Post thought that "J. Guevera and Special J, the New York City septet's frontmen, are extremely clever wordsmiths drawn to both cosmic themes and street scenes." The Baltimore Sun opined that "the raps themselves are heavy with references to disco-era pop culture ... funky and melodic tracks such as 'Riot Nrrrd', 'Wild Kingdom' and 'The Best' stand out from others that are at least entertaining if not so inspired."

AllMusic wrote that "occasionally, the group's kitschy pop culture references grate, but on the whole, the album is an impressive collection of hardcore rap that finds the middle ground between Public Enemy and Cypress Hill."

Track listing

References

1998 albums
2 Skinnee J's albums
Capricorn Records albums